Walter Richard Pollock Hamilton VC (18 August 1856 – 3 September 1879) was born in Inistioge, County Kilkenny and was an Irish recipient of the Victoria Cross, the highest and most prestigious award for gallantry in the face of the enemy that can be awarded to British and Commonwealth forces. He is featured in M. M. Kaye's epic novel The Far Pavilions.

Details
Hamilton was a great nephew of General Sir George Pollock who led the Army of Retribution in the First Afghan War. He was educated at Felsted. Hamilton was 22 years old, and a lieutenant in the Staff Corps and Corps of Guides, Indian Army during the Second Afghan War when the following deed took place on 2 April 1879 at Futtehabad, Afghanistan, 
for which he was awarded the VC:

The scene of Hamilton's death was the Bala Hissar, an enclosure within the city of Kabul. He commanded a small force of 20 Cavalry and 50 Infantry, all from the Corps of Guides, which formed an escort for Sir Louis Cavagnari the Envoy who was to set up the Residency in Kabul following the Treaty of Gandamak. After a riot by mutinous Afghan troops, who were demanding arrears of pay, the Residency was attacked on 3 September 1879. Fierce fighting took place between the Guides and the attackers, during which Cavagnari and all the Guides were killed.

On 15 May 1879, six weeks after the action at Futtehabad, the Government in India forwarded a Victoria Cross recommendation for Hamilton to London which on 6 August determined that his act was not covered by the Victoria Cross regulations. There was a change of heart when the Secretary of State for India, Lord Cranbrook, noted that Hamilton's actions were similar to those of Captain John Cook and Lieutenant Reginald Hart who had both been awarded the Victoria Cross two months earlier. By this stage Hamilton had been killed at Kabul on 3 September and in order to avoid the precedent of seeming to approve a posthumous award the submission to the Queen on 28 September was backdated to 1 September 1879. The award was gazetted on 7 October 1879, the 12th Victoria Cross recommendation approved after the death of the recipient.

Memorials

A slightly over-life-size statue of Hamilton striding over an Afghan threatening him with a knife was produced in bronze-painted plaster by Charles Bell Birch in Dublin in around 1880. It is now on display in the National Army Museum, Chelsea, as is a plaque to him (set up in the Punjab Frontier Force Chapel, then in the sanctum crypt of St. Lukes Chapel, Chelsea).

In the media

Walter Hamilton is a character in the novel "The Far Pavilions", in the HBO-miniseries adaption he was portrayed by Benedict Taylor.

References

Listed in order of publication year 
The Register of the Victoria Cross (1981, 1988 and 1997)

Ireland's VCs  (Dept of Economic Development, 1995)
Monuments to Courage (David Harvey, 1999)
 History of Felsted School (1864–1947), (Michael Craze, pp. 198–201; Cowell, 1955))

External links
VC medal auction details
Lieutenant Walter Hamilton
The Residency
 The Defence of the Kabul Residency
Hamilton's statue

1856 births
1879 deaths
19th-century Irish people
Irish soldiers in the British Army
People from County Kilkenny
People educated at Felsted School
Irish recipients of the Victoria Cross
British Indian Army personnel killed in action
East Surrey Regiment officers
Second Anglo-Afghan War recipients of the Victoria Cross
Corps of Guides (India) officers
Bengal Staff Corps officers
Military personnel from County Kilkenny